Alanis Morissette: The Collection is a greatest hits compilation album by Canadian-American singer-songwriter Alanis Morissette, released in the United States on 15 November 2005. It comprises material from 1995 to 2005, with some soundtrack selections and a cover of Seal's "Crazy". A limited edition release, which included a DVD, followed on 6 December 2005.

Morissette's singles that are not on the album include "All I Really Want", "Joining You", "Unsent", "So Pure", the live track "King of Pain" (a cover of The Police song), "Precious Illusions", "21 Things I Want in a Lover", "Flinch", the American single "Utopia" and the European single "Out Is Through". Additionally, none of her eight dance-pop single releases under MCA Records' Canada imprint are present.

As of March 2012, the album has sold 401,000 copies in the United States and more than 1,000,000 worldwide.

Track listing

Charts

Weekly charts

Year-end charts

Single

Certifications

References

External links 
 The Collection site at Alanis.com

Alanis Morissette albums
2005 greatest hits albums
Maverick Records compilation albums